GURPS Bestiary is a source book for the GURPS role-playing game system containing information and statistics of animals. It also contains information animal player character templates, and tips for fitting animals into adventures. The first edition was published in 1988.

Contents
The GURPS Bestiary contains over 200 creatures to populate the various worlds of the GURPS universe. The book classifies creatures by terrain type, and deals with normal animals, legendary beasts, and otherworld creatures. The book also contains GM commentaries on handling animal encounters, hunting and trapping, animals as companions, and how to create new animals.

This supplement describes several hundred animals and monsters, mostly organized by habitat (e.g., arctic, desert, forest, jungle, swamp and subterranean) plus dinosaurs, domestic animals, otherworldly creatures, and "loathsome crawlers"; the book also includes rules and guidelines for game-mastering animals, animal companions, and hunting.

GURPS Bestiary is a universal sourcebook for GURPS that is intended to be usable in many different settings.

Publication history
The 1st edition of the GURPS Bestiary was written by Steffan O'Sullivan, with a cover by Ken Kelly and illustrations by Dan Carroll, and was first published by Steve Jackson Games in 1988 as a 112-page book.

The 2nd edition of GURPS Bestiary was updated by Chris McCubbin and Bob Schroeck, and had rules for were-creatures that wound up in GURPS Shapeshifters (2003). McCubbin and Schroeck wrote an article in a 1993 issue of Pyramid (a magazine published by Steve Jackson Games), offering extra material for the book.

The current version of GURPS Bestiary is the 3rd edition, which was revised by Hunter Johnson and again featured Ken Kelly's cover art. Released in 2000, this expanded edition is 128 pages in length. Johnson published extra material for the 3rd edition in a 2000 issue of Pyramid. As of August 2014, the 3rd edition of GURPS Bestiary was out of print, and a 4th edition had not yet been released for the 4th edition GURPS RPG system.

All three editions featured the same cover image by Ken Kelly.

Reception
Jim Bambra reviewed GURPS Bestiary for Dragon magazine #140 (December 1988). He comments on the book: "The art is fairly poor — about the same standard as that in the Monster Manual — so don't expect to be thrilled by the illustrations. The GURPS Bestiary has much to offer GURPS GMs, but it is of limited use to anyone looking for new critters to add to his favorite game system."

See also
List of GURPS books

References

Sources
Bestiary Website
GURPS Bestiary by Stephan O'Sullivan 

Bestiary
Role-playing game supplements introduced in 1988